Naiara Beristain González (born 4 January 1992) is a Spanish footballer who plays as a midfielder.

Club career
Beristain made her debut in the Primera División with Athletic Bilbao in 2009. In 2012, she signed with Real Sociedad, becoming the first female player to move in that direction between the local rival clubs.

She left the Basque Country to join Valencia in 2014, but returned to Real Sociedad two years later. She moved to Valencia again in 2018 on a two-year contract.

International career
She participated in the 2011 Under-19 Euro, where she scored an equalizer in Spain's first match against the Netherlands.

Honours
 Athletic Bilbao
 Copa de la Reina: runner-up 2012

Valencia
 Copa de la Reina: runner-up 2015

References

External links
Profile at LaLiga
Profile at Txapeldunak.com 
 

1992 births
Living people
Footballers from Getxo
Spanish women's footballers
Women's association football midfielders
Athletic Club Femenino B players
Athletic Club Femenino players
Valencia CF Femenino players
Primera División (women) players
Spain women's youth international footballers
21st-century Spanish women